Chavar County is in Ilam province, Iran. The capital of the county is the city of Chavar. At the 2006 census, the region's population (as Chavar District of Ilam County) was 11,860 in 2,378 households. The following census in 2011 counted 11,710 people in 2,692 households. At the 2016 census, the district's population was 10,554 in 2,752 households. After the census, Chavar District was elevated to the status of Chavar County.

Administrative divisions

The population history and structural changes of Chavar County's administrative divisions (as a district of Ilam County) over three consecutive censuses are shown in the following table.

See also
Eyvan County

References

Counties of Ilam Province

fa:شهرستان چوار